Francesca DiMattio (born 1981) is an American artist born and based in New York City. She makes paintings and ceramic sculpture that weave elements using architectural, design, cultural and historical references.

Life
DiMattio grew up in the Chelsea neighborhood of New York City.  Her mother was a college counselor and ceramist and her father was a vision scientist in the Physiology Dept. at NYU Medical Center.  She attended NYC Public schools including the Lab School and LaGuardia High School of Music and Art graduating in 1999. She received her BFA from the Cooper Union in 2003 and her MFA from Columbia University of the Arts in 2005.
She lives and works in New York City and Hillsdale, NY.

Career
Francesca DiMattio (born 1981) is an American artist born and based in New York City. She makes paintings that weave spaces using architectural, cultural and historical references. Patterns, textures and imagery combine to forge a logical cohesion from apparently disparate and chaotic elements. Large mural works on canvas have been displayed in the Saatchi Gallery in London, Locust Projects in Miami, Salon 94 Bowery in NYC and the Institute of Contemporary Art, Boston.

In recent solo shows (2014-8) in New York City and London she has introduced ceramic sculpture that aspires to the monumental via a feminine strength and whimsy. DiMattio fractures and reconfigures a wide array of references including art history, children’s books, cartoons, pop culture, and craft. Though elements seem ready-made, she, in fact, sculpts and glazes everything by hand. Her sculptures are complex and multifaceted—each angle revealing seemingly endless experimentations in ceramic and glazing techniques. Throughout each assemblage, DiMattio’s layering and fragmentation maps a crucial dialogue between cultures and styles, pointing to the plasticity of representation. Through shifts in scale, elements that are typically accents become primary. Things do not behave as expected. Tiny figurines appear over scaled, floral motifs become viral, and torsos morph from flora and fauna.  Through painting and the hybridization of art and craft she has introduced a dialogue with the past that has enlivened the contemporary world art scene.

Her ceramic sculptures include monumental candelabras heavy with historical references suggesting the weight of ceramic styles on chaotic post-modern lighting and living.  Her totems reference Greek Caryatids carried into a present rethinking of the weight women bear today.A large monstrous 9-foot tall piece, She-Wolf (2018), evokes Yeats’, The Second Coming with its ending …” And what rough beast, its hour come round at last,  Slouches towards Bethlehem to be born?” 

The Caryatid works “exemplify this penchant for hybridity, each one encapsulating several oppositions between masculine and feminine, playful and serious, contemporary and ancient, high culture and low”(Fullerton). DiMattio takes traditional aspects of femininity and adds different components to the design of the sculpture.“Despite the show’s title, one was immediately struck by the fact that these figures had been liberated from their traditional role as architectural supports”(Fullerton). The layering in her work is not only visual but also figurative, for example the freeing of the caryatid can be looked at as freeing the female body of traditional view. DiMattio also creates paintings that “take architecture as their subject as a means to restructure the concept of space”(Saatchi). In her paintings Ladder and Broken Arch at the Saatchi Gallery,“elements collide into each other, become entangled, and co-exist—complicating our understanding of perspective and space. Her work seems to exist somewhere in between the abstract and the figurative”(Saatchi). In Boston, DiMattio has transformed the Sandra and Gerald Fineberg Art Wall with a complex composition made up of five large-scale canvases. Drawing inspiration from the ICA’s dramatic architecture and waterfront setting, Banquet combines interior and exterior space and incorporates images of ships and the sea. In 2015, DiMattio designed a sculpture, Chandelobra, reflected her understanding of overturning the stereotyped image of chandelier that are related to feminine and deconstructing them into a unpredictable, explosive, and unfamiliar object (https://salon94.com/exhibitions/domestic-sculpture/). Another sculpture, Bloemenhouder (2015), DiMattio makes hundreds of porcelain and decorated them with flowers. The sculpture are overly occupied with ornaments, and the floral decorations are viral, immersing the bottom of the sculpture. This sculpture represents how DiMattio achieves balance in beauty through destruction and abstract expression. Although some people consider DiMattio’s artwork as deviant, her use of bold styles, glazes and design made audiences think outside of the box and ponder over the traditional way of beauty.

Exhibitions
2005 – Paradise Lost, Marvelli Gallery, New York; -First Look, Hudson Valley Center for Contemporary Art, Peekskill, NY
2006 – New Work, Salon 94, New York; -The General's Jamboree- Guild & Greyshkul Gallery, New York
2007 – Abstract America, Saatchi Gallery, London, UK; -Unhinged, Laxart, Los Angeles, CA; -True Faith, Greenberg Van Doren Gallery, New York; -Killers and Their Hiding Places, World Class Boxing, Miami, FL
2008 – November Again, Harris Lieberman Gallery, NY
2009 – Futurescape, Contemporary Art Galleries, University of Connecticut, Storrs, CT; -Master of Reality, curated by Joseph Wardwell, The Herbert and Mildred Lee Gallery, Rose Art Museum, Brandeis University, Waltham, MA; -Salon 94, New York Salon 94 Freemans, New York, NY; -Decollage, Locust Projects, Miami, FL
2010 – Francesca DiMattio, Sandra & Gerald Fineberg Art Wall, Institute of Contemporary Art, Boston, MA; -Francesca DiMattio/Garth Weiser, The Suburban, Chicago, IL.; –Portugal Arte 10, Lisbon, Portugal
2011 – Bouquet, Conduits Gallery, Milan, Italy; -Extended Painting International, Prague Biennial, Prague, Czech Republic; 8 Americans, Alain Noirhomme Gallery, Brussels, Belgium; 4 Rooms, CCA Ujazdowski Castle, Warsaw, Poland
2012 – Francesca DiMattio, Table Setting and Flower Arranging, March 17 – April 21, 2012, Salon 94 Bowery, New York, NY; -Modern Talking, Cluj Museum, Cluj, Romania; -Four Rooms, CSW Zamek, Warsaw, Poland
2013 – Vertical Arrangements, Zabludowicz Collection, London, England 
2014 – Francesca DiMattio: Housewares, Blaffer Art Museum, Houston, TX 
2015 – Confection, Pippy Houldsworth Gallery, London, England; -Domestic Sculpture, Salon 94 Bowery, New York, NY
2018 – Boucherouite, Salon 94 Bowery, New York, NY

References

External links
 Carved from Nature, Garage Magazine, September 2018
 Francesca DiMattio ; The New Yorker, 2017
 Packard, Cassie, Francesca DiMattio's Grotesque, Delicious Sculptures Will Rob You of Certainty, Vice, September 21, 2015
 Corcoran, Heather, Ceramic Artist Francesca DiMattio Explores the Beauty in Domesticity, Dwell, April 2, 2015

1981 births
Living people
20th-century American painters
21st-century American painters
Painters from New York City
American women painters
20th-century American women artists
21st-century American women artists
Columbia University School of the Arts alumni
Cooper Union alumni
American people of Italian descent